Ekspress-AM6 ( meaning Express-AM6) is a Russian communications satellite which was launched in 2014. The satellite has replaced the older Ekspress-AM22, at 53° East. Part of the Ekspress series of geostationary communications satellites, it is owned and operated by the Russian Satellite Communications Company (RSCC).

Satellite description 
The satellite has 14 C-band, 44 Ku-band, 12 Ka-band and 2 L-band transponders.

Launch 
The satellite was launched on a Proton-M / Briz-M launch vehicle from Baikonur Cosmodrome. The Briz-M upper stage shut down too early in the fourth burn and left the satellite in a lower than planned orbit. The satellite reached the operational geostationary orbit by using its own propulsion.

List of providers

Eutelsat 53A 
Five transponders are leased to Eutelsat and are marketed under the name Eutelsat 53A since May 2015.

See also 

 Ekspress

References 

Ekspress satellites
Spacecraft launched in 2014
Satellites using the Ekspress bus
Communications satellites in geostationary orbit
2014 in Russia